David Hilary Trump (August 27, 1931 – August 31, 2016) was a British archaeologist known for his work in the area of Maltese prehistory. In 1954, Trump helped John Davies Evans excavate at Ġgantija. He took part in the excavation of many important sites in Maltese prehistory, including the Skorba Temples and Xagħra Stone Circle . From 1958-1963, he was a curator at the National Museum of Archaeology, Malta. He retired in 1997. He was awarded the National Order of Merit by Malta in 2004.

Selected bibliography
 Skorba: A Neolithic Temple in Malta, Society of Antiquaries of London
 Skorba, Oxford University Press (1966)
 Malta : an Archaeological Guide, Faber et Faber, Londres (1972)
 The Penguin Dictionary of Archaeology, Penguin Books Ltd (1972)
 Malta, Nagel Publishers (1980) 
 Prehistory  of the Mediterranean, Yale University Press (1980)
 Malta, Prehistory and Temples, Midsea Books Ltd (2003)
 Greece and Rome Victorious, 500 B.C.-200 B.C, Macmillan Publishers
 The American Heritage Guide to Archaeology, American Heritage Press
 A Dictionary of Archaeology, Penguin Books Ltd, 
 Ancient Rome, Granada Publishing
 The Atlas of Early Man, Macmillan Publishers Ltd
 Cart-Ruts and their impact on the Maltese landscape, Heritage Books (2008)

References

1931 births
2016 deaths
Alumni of Pembroke College, Cambridge
British archaeologists
Recipients of the National Order of Merit (Malta)